Bernardus Hermanus Croon (11 May 1886, in Amsterdam – 30 January 1960, in Amsterdam) was a Dutch rower who competed in the 1908 Summer Olympics.

After a four months training period, he competed in the 1908 Summer Olympics in the coxless four event. He and the other of the team were a member of “de Amstel” and were trained by Ooms. He was the strokeman of the Dutch boat, which won the bronze medal in the coxless fours.

References

External links
profile

1886 births
1960 deaths
Dutch male rowers
Olympic rowers of the Netherlands
Rowers at the 1908 Summer Olympics
Olympic bronze medalists for the Netherlands
Rowers from Amsterdam
Olympic medalists in rowing
Medalists at the 1908 Summer Olympics
19th-century Dutch people
20th-century Dutch people